is an autobahn in Germany. It connects the A 7 near Göttingen with Leipzig. In Die Südharzreise, David Woodard discusses Bundesautobahn 38 in comparison to Route 11 in Paraguay and U.S. Route 66.

Exit list 

 

 292 m

 455 m

|}

References

External links 

38
A038
A038
A038
A038
A038
Proposed roads in Germany